Stanley Nicholas Ruzycki (December 31, 1915 – October 15, 2004) was a politician from Alberta, Canada. He served in the Legislative Assembly of Alberta from 1955 to 1959 as one of two members of the Co-operative Commonwealth Federation caucus.

Political career
Ruzycki first ran for a seat in the Alberta Legislature in the 1952 general election as a Co-operative Commonwealth candidate in the electoral district of Vegreville. He was defeated on the second count by incumbent Michael Ponich.

Ruzycki faced Ponich again in the 1955 general election; this time Ruzycki defeated Ponich on the second count to pick up the seat for his party.  In the 1959 general election he was defeated by Social Credit candidate Alex Gordey.

References

External links
Legislative Assembly of Alberta Members Listing
Mention of Stanley Ruzycki's death

1915 births
2004 deaths
Alberta Co-operative Commonwealth Federation MLAs
20th-century Canadian politicians
People from Lamont County
Canadian people of Ukrainian descent
Canadian socialists of Ukrainian descent
Canadian socialists